Shi Xing Mi (Walter Gjergja) is a Shaolin secular monk of the 32nd generation, speaker and writer.

Biography

Early martial arts practice

Walter Gjergja started studying Shaolin Kung Fu in his early teens in Italy and France, winning numerous international competitions in both forms (traditional Kung Fu and modern WuShu) and fighting (Sanda and Qingda/Quingda), initially in Europe (late 1980s) and later in Asia (early 1990s).

Further studies and work
In 2002 Shi Xing Mi returned to Italy and decided to teach full-time in Europe and Asia, subsequently appearing in television documentaries (BBC, Discovery Channel, Disney XD, Italia1, CCTV, Wild and the 2nd episode of the popular martial arts show "Kill Arman"), numerous press articles (Men's Health, Outside Magazine, Sportweek, Die Zeit, Kung Fu Magazine, For Men, Handelsblatt, Corriere Della Sera, Frankfurt Allgemeine, Budo, etc.), demonstrations and major events.

Teaching

In 2004 he founded in Milan the first Italian Shaolin culture center, Shaolin Wuseng Houbeidui Italy, today with several branches in Italy and Switzerland. Over the years he has taught in more than thirty countries.

Since 2008 he has also utilised his cultural and professional background to apply Shaolin principles and methods to diversified contexts such as human development, business management and sports performance, conducting keynote speeches, seminars and workshops at various international conferences (TEDx, FIBO, World Economic Forum, Trainertage, etc.) and for companies such as BMW, Bayer, Red Bull, Apple, McKinsey & Company, Siltronic, UBS, Merck, Technogym, Jaguar and many more, as well as coaching professional sports people in football, tennis, winter sports and combat sports. 

From 2020 he is Head of Mindfulness and Board Adviser of an international group of companies developing innovative global wellness projects.

Shi Xing Mi (Walter Gjergja) lives in a village in Ticino, Switzerland, and teaches mostly in Europe and Asia.

References

External links
 Official website - Shi Xing Mi ||| Walter Gjergja
 Shaolin Europe Association - SEA

Italian male martial artists
Shaolinquan practitioners
Zen Buddhist spiritual teachers
Italian male writers
Living people
Year of birth missing (living people)